The Fear Market is a 1920 American silent drama film directed by Kenneth Webb and written by Clara Beranger. The film stars Alice Brady, Frank Losee, Harry Mortimer, Richard Hatteras, Edith Stockton, and Bradley Barker. The film was released on January 25, 1920, by Realart Pictures Corporation.

Cast
Alice Brady as Sylvia Stone
Frank Losee as Maj. Stone
Harry Mortimer as Ettare Forni
Richard Hatteras as Oliver Ellis
Edith Stockton as Laura Hill
Bradley Barker as Bob Sayres
Nora Reed as Milly Sayres
Frederick Burton as Jim Carson
Alfred Hickman as Dicky Wilkes
Sara Biala as Emilia Botti

References

External links

1920 films
1920s English-language films
Silent American drama films
1920 drama films
Films directed by Kenneth Webb
American silent feature films
American black-and-white films
1920s American films